Matias Ojala (born 28.2.1995) is a Finnish footballer, currently playing for FC Inter Turku in the Finnish Veikkausliiga.

Early career
Born and raised in Oulu, Ojala started his footballing career with local club AC Oulu, making his debut on Finnish top-flight on 12 August 2010, only at the age of 15. By doing this, he became the youngest player in history to make an appearance in Veikkausliiga.

He was however unable to make more appearances during the season as AC Oulu finished 11th. Because of their financial situation, the club however dropped down a level as they were denied a league license by the Finnish FA

This proved to be a good career point for Ojala, as he went on making 58 appearances and scoring 9 goals for Oulu during the next three seasons combined in the Finnish second division. During his final season with Oulu, he replaced the legendary  Mika Nurmela as the team captain, only at the age of 18.

Career
On 27 August 2013, it was announced that Ojala had joined German Bundesliga side HSV on loan until summer 2014, with an option to buy. He was promoted to train with the first team for the first time in early October.

On 7 November 2019, FC Inter Turku confirmed the signing of Ojala for the 2020 season on a deal until the end of 2021.

References

1995 births
Living people
Finnish footballers
Finnish expatriate footballers
Finland youth international footballers
Sportspeople from Oulu
Oulun Luistinseura players
Hamburger SV II players
AC Oulu players
Kemi City F.C. players
FC Ilves players
FC Inter Turku players
Veikkausliiga players
Regionalliga players
Association football midfielders
Finnish expatriate sportspeople in Germany
Expatriate footballers in Germany